Andreas Baalsrud (5 March 1872 – 23 January 1961) was a Norwegian civil engineer.

He was born at Stavern in Vestfold, Norway. He took his education at the Christiania Technical School and Zurich Polytechnicum. He was hired by the Norwegian Public Roads Administration in 1891, and worked as district engineer in Vest-Agder from 1912 to 1919. From 1919 to 1945 he served as director of the Norwegian Directorate of Public Roads. Baalsrud married to Christine Andrea Christofersen (1878–1956). They were the parents of newspaper editor Terje Baalsrud (1914-2003).

References

1872 births
1987 deaths
20th-century Norwegian engineers
Directors of government agencies of Norway
University of Oslo alumni
People from Larvik
Directorate of Public Roads people